"Me Hipnotizas" (English: "You Hypnotize Me") is a song recorded by Mexican singer Anahí for her fifth studio album Mi Delirio (2009). It was revealed that the song is the second single from the album released on February 22, 2010, on radio, and digitally on March 16, 2010.

Background
In early August 2009, Anahí revealed that Gloria Trevi had given her, two songs composed by herself for her new album; "Me Hipnotizas" and "Mala Suerte" (not included on Mi Delirio). Later, on August 20, 2009, she finally revealed the song's name produced by Gil Cerezo and Ulises Lozano from Kinky and the possibility to include it on her album. Only "Me Hipnotizas" was included on the album, "Mala Suerte" wasn't included, but is performed on her tours, the studio version was also leaked later.

Music video

Development
A music video for the song was filmed in Woodland Hills, Los Angeles, California in April 2010. It was directed by Ricardo Moreno, with a team of 40 people of different countries. The filming took six hours; she also supervised and collaborated with the design team in charge of wardrobe, animation, and makeup.

The music video director was Ricardo Moreno, a highly respected director who has worked with big names such as: Juan Gabriel, Pepe Aguilar, Los Tigres del Norte and worldwide rock band, Foo Fighters.

Synopsis
The story plot evolves around a mystical tree that hides a man which has broken Anahí's heart. The video was shot in four main sets, which take Anahí from the desert, streets, forest, and battle zone where she confronts a platoon of soldiers. In the video, she wears several outfits, including an Arab garb in golden tones type, a silver dress and a look very similar to her role in Rebelde. Anahí, is a huge supporter protecting the original entity of nature, in this video she transmits her love for Mother Nature. She also conveys a hidden message of the negative outcome that comes with war.

Track listing
iTunes digital single

Awards and nominations

Charts 
On the Mexican charts, the song was charted at number 11.

Release history

References

External links
"Me Hipnotizas" music video filming: exclusive pictures
"Me Hipnotizas" music video

2010 singles
Anahí songs
Songs written by Gloria Trevi
Spanish-language songs
2009 songs